Slender trefoil is a common name for several plants and may refer to:

Lotus tenuis, native to western and southern Europe and southwest Asia
Trifolium micranthum, native to central and western Europe